George Warren Hawkins  (born 1946) is a New Zealand politician. He has served in local government, including as mayor of Papakura from 1983 to 1992, and in New Zealand parliament as a member for the Labour Party between 1990 and 2011.

Early life 
Hawkins was born on 15 May 1946 in the Auckland suburb of Mt Eden. He attended Dominion Road Primary School, Mount Albert Grammar School (1960–1963) and then Auckland Teachers' College. Before entering politics, he was a teacher and had also been a photographer for the Auckland Star newspaper. He later became a company director.

Political career 
In the 1970s Hawkins became an anti-nuclear activist and he joined the Labour Party. He became chair of Labour's Papakura branch. In early 1977 he stood as a candidate for the Labour Party nomination in the Mangere by-election, but he lost out to future prime minister David Lange.

Papakura
Hawkins was a Papakura City councillor from 1980 to 1983. He was elected Mayor of Papakura in 1983, and held that position until 1992. He was succeeded by his brother David Hawkins. In 1989, Papakura City became Papakura District as part of the local government reforms. As mayor he advocated for a toll free telephone exchange between South Auckland and Auckland City.

Member of Parliament

In 1990 Hawkins was selected to succeed Roger Douglas as the Labour candidate for the seat of Manurewa, beating Alan Johnson, a town planner and opponent of Douglas. He served as MP for Manurewa from when he was first elected to Parliament in the 1990 general election. In November 1990 he was appointed as Labour's spokesperson for local government and urban affairs by Labour leader Mike Moore.

In July 1992 Hawkins was hospitalized suffering from an infection and exhaustion. While in hospital he suffered a pulmonary embolism, leading him to an extended convalescence. He later decided to retire from the Papakura mayoralty to ease his workload. During the period he suffered a stroke, which would leave him with a speech impediment. At the time Hawkins (and others) thought bad health would end his career. He continued on, however, stating "But it [his condition] made me think that some things are really worth fighting for."

When Helen Clark replaced Moore as leader in 1993 she appointed Hawkins Shadow Minister of Police and the Serious Fraud Office.

In the Fifth Labour government, he served as Minister of Internal Affairs, Minister of Police, Minister of Civil Defence, and Minister of Veterans' Affairs in the 2002–2005 parliamentary term.

Disappointed at being ranked 25th on the 2005 Labour Party list, he withdrew his name from the list, and won the Manurewa seat with a comfortable margin of over 12,000 votes (a similar majority to his 2002 election win). Although Hawkins was criticised over his handling of police issues, in particular 111 calls, he remained a Minister until he made the decision not to seek a new position in Cabinet after the 2005 election. He subsequently became a backbencher and became regarded by colleagues as a quiet maverick, asking written questions of ministers in the same manner that Opposition MPs would do.

He resisted calls to retire, which intensified in 2007 when Hawkins took two months off to have an operation for bowel cancer. He believed many in the Labour Party coveted his safe electorate seat and stated of many of the visitors he received in hospital "They didn't want to hold your hand, they wanted to take your pulse." In the 2008 general election he again chose not to be placed on the party list, and again won his Manurewa seat. However his majority was cut by more than half. Following the defeat of the Labour government Hawkins was appointed Shadow Minister of Housing by Clark's successor as leader, Phil Goff. He retired from Parliament in 2011.

Local board member 
In 2013 Hawkins returned to local government when he was elected a member of the Manurewa Local Board.

Honors and recognition
In the 2013 New Year Honours, Hawkins was appointed a Companion of the Queen's Service Order for services as a member of Parliament.

References

External links
 Parliamentary page

1946 births
Living people
Mayors of Papakura
Members of the Cabinet of New Zealand
New Zealand Labour Party MPs
People from Mount Eden
People educated at Mount Albert Grammar School
Companions of the Queen's Service Order
Members of the New Zealand House of Representatives
New Zealand MPs for Auckland electorates
21st-century New Zealand politicians